Viviparus contectus, common name Lister's river snail, is a species of large, freshwater snail with an operculum and a gill, an aquatic gastropod mollusk in the family Viviparidae, the river snails.This  snail  is not a native of the uk

Distribution
This is not a native of the UK.
This species is palaearctic in distribution, specifically Europe and western Siberia, including:

 Great Britain, specifically eastern England
 Netherlands
 Germany - endangered (3 gefährdet)
 Austria
 Czech Republic - near threatened (NT)
 Slovakia
 Russia - Sverdlovsk oblast

Habitat
This large snail lives in slow flowing rivers and canals which are unpolluted, and which have hard water with many water weeds.

References

External links

Viviparidae
Gastropods described in 1813
Taxa named by Pierre-Aimé Millet